Diego Esaú Gómez Medina (born 10 September 2003) is a Mexican professional footballer who plays as a midfielder for Liga MX club Necaxa.

Career statistics

Club

References

External links
 
 
 

Living people
2003 births
Mexican footballers
Mexico youth international footballers
Association football midfielders
Club Necaxa footballers
Liga MX players
Footballers from Aguascalientes
People from Pabellón de Arteaga Municipality